TNF receptor associated factors (TRAFs) are a family of proteins primarily involved in the regulation of inflammation, antiviral responses and apoptosis.

Currently, seven TRAF proteins have been characterized in mammals: TRAF1, TRAF2, TRAF3, TRAF4, TRAF5, TRAF6 and TRAF7.

Except for TRAF7, these proteins share a relatively conserved secondary structure, including a namesake C-terminal TRAF domain that mediates interactions with other signaling components such as the transmembrane TNF receptors and CD40.

See also
 Tumor necrosis factors

References

External links
 

TNF receptor family